Mawk'allaqta, also Mawk'a Llaqta (Quechua mawk'a ancient, llaqta place (village, town, city, country, nation), "ancient place", hispanicized spellings Maukallacta, Maukallaqta, Mauk'allaqta) is an archaeological site in Peru. It is located in the Cusco Region, Espinar Province, on the border of the districts Coporaque and Suykutambo.

See also 
 Taqrachullu

References 

Archaeological sites in Peru
Archaeological sites in Cusco Region